The Russo-Turkish War (1806–1812) between the Russian Empire and the Ottoman Empire was one of the Russo-Ottoman Wars. Russia prevailed, but both sides wanted peace as they feared Napoleon's moves to the east.

Background
The war broke out against the background of the Napoleonic Wars. In 1806, Sultan Selim III, encouraged by the Russian defeat at Austerlitz and advised by the French Empire, deposed the pro-Russian Constantine Ypsilantis as Hospodar of the Principality of Wallachia and Alexander Mourousis as Hospodar of Moldavia, both Ottoman vassal states. Simultaneously, the French Empire occupied Dalmatia and threatened to penetrate the Danubian principalities at any time. In order to safeguard the Russian border against a possible French attack, a 40,000-strong Russian contingent advanced into Moldavia and Wallachia. The Sultan reacted by blocking the Dardanelles to Russian ships and declared war on Russia.

Early hostilities
Initially, Emperor Alexander I was reluctant to concentrate large forces against the Ottoman Empire while his relations with Napoleonic France were still uncertain and the main part of his army was occupied fighting against Napoleon in Prussia. A massive Ottoman offensive aimed at Russian-occupied Bucharest, the Wallachian capital, was promptly checked at Obilesti by as few as 4,500 soldiers commanded by Mikhail Miloradovich (June 2, 1807). In Armenia, the 7,000-strong contingent of Count Gudovich destroyed the Turkish force of 20,000 at Arpachai (June 18). In the meantime, the Russian Imperial Navy under Dmitry Senyavin blockaded the Dardanelles and defeated the Ottoman fleet in the Battle of the Dardanelles, after which Selim III was deposed. The Ottoman fleet was destroyed the following month in the Battle of Athos, thus establishing Russian supremacy on sea.

Campaigns of 1808–10
At this point the war might have ended, if it were not for the Peace of Tilsit. The Russian Emperor, constrained by Napoleon to sign an armistice with the Turks, used the time of peace to transfer more Russian soldiers from Prussia to Bessarabia. After the southern army was augmented to 80,000 and the hostilities were resumed, the 76-year-old commander-in-chief Prozorovsky made little progress in more than a year. In August 1809 he was eventually succeeded by Prince Bagration, who promptly crossed the Danube and overran Dobruja. Bagration proceeded to lay siege to Silistra but, on hearing that the 50,000-strong Turkish army approached the city, deemed it wise to evacuate Dobruja and retreat to Bessarabia.

In 1810, the hostilities were renewed by the brothers Nikolay and Sergei Kamensky, who defeated the Ottoman reinforcement heading for Silistra and ousted the Turks from Hacıoğlu Pazarcık (May 22). The position of Silistra now appeared hopeless, and the garrison surrendered on May, 30. Ten days later, Kamensky laid siege to another strong fortress, Shumla (or Schumen). His storm of the citadel was repelled at great loss of life, and more bloodshed ensued during the storming of the Danubian port of Rousse (or Rustchuk) on 22 July. The latter fortress did not fall to the Russians until 9 September, after Kamensky's army had surprised and routed a huge Turkish detachment at Batyn on 26 August. On 26 October, Kamensky again defeated a 40,000-strong army of Osman Pasha at Vidin. The Russians lost only 1,500 men, compared with 10,000 for their opponents.

However, the young Nikolay Kamensky caught a serious illness on February 4, 1811 and died soon thereafter, left the army under the command of Louis Alexandre Andrault de Langeron. To this point, although the Russians had won many battles, they had failed to achieve any important victories that would force the Ottomans to end the war. Furthermore, relationship between France and Russia quickly became strained, pointing to the inevitable renewal of hostilities between the countries. The Russian Empire found that she needed to end the southern war quickly in order to concentrate on dealing with Napoleon. In such a situation, Tsar Alexander appointed his disfavoured general Mikhail Kutuzov to be the new commander of the Russian force.

Kutuzov's campaign (1811) 

Kutuzov's first action upon taking command was to reduce the size of the garrisons in the fortresses along the Danube and retreat back into Wallachia. The Russian withdrawal induced the Turks to launch a counter-offensive to recapture lost territory. In the spring of 1811, 60,000 Turkish troops led by Grand Vizier Ahmed Pasha gathered at Šumnu, the strongest fortress in Ottoman Bulgaria and set out on a campaign to confront Kutuzov's army. Kutuzov's army was also large with 46,000 soldiers, however, he was responsible for protecting the full 600 mile Danube River border between Wallachia and Ottoman Bulgaria.

On 22 June 1811, the two forces met in battle at Rusçuk on the Danube. After a long struggle, the Russians successfully repelled Ahmed Pasha's larger army. A few days later as the Turks were preparing to attack the Russians in the Rusçuk fortress, Kutuzov ordered his forces to cross the Danube and retreat back into Wallachia.

Believing that the Russians were trying to escape, Ahmed Pasha decided to launch an attack. On 28 August, 36,000 Turkish troops began to cross the Danube River to assault the Russians. The Turkish force established a fortified bridgehead on the left bank of the river near the small village of Slobozia where they were quickly surrounded by two divisions of Kutuzov's army. The remaining 20,000 men of Ahmed Pasha's army remained at the Turkish field camp on the right bank near Rusçuk where they guarded the munitions and supplies. On the night of 1 October 1811, however, a Russian detachment of 7,500 men secretly crossed the Danube. In the morning the Russians overwhelmed the Turkish troops in a surprise attack. The Turks panicked and scattered, suffering 2,000 casualties. Thereafter, the Russian forces completely enveloped the Turkish bridgehead on the left bank of the Danube and initiated an all-out artillery attack.

For approximately six weeks, the Russians sieged and bombarded the Turkish bridgehead. Surrounded with their supply lines cut, the Turks suffered not only from a persistent Russian bombardment but also from malnutrition and disease. A ceasefire was agreed upon on 25 October and approximately three weeks later on 14 November 1811, Ahmed Pasha agreed to a truce and formally surrendered to Kutuzov. The magnitude of the Turkish defeat with 36,000 casualties, ended the war along the Danube and led to peace negotiations ultimately resulting in the signing of the Treaty of Bucharest on 28 May 1812.

Caucasus front

Six years of war on the eastern front left the border unchanged. Fighting here was more serious than during the Russo-Turkish War of 1787–1792, but it was still a sideshow to the main action. Russia crossed the Caucasus and annexed Georgia, the western half of which had been nominally Turkish. It also had taken the Persian vassal khanates along the Caspian coast and east of Georgia. The area around modern Armenia (Erivan Khanate and Nakhichevan Khanate) was still Persian. Russia was also at war with Persia but the Turks and Persians did not help each other. A large part of the Russian army was tied up because of Napoleon's threat in the west. The Russian Viceroys were 1806: Ivan Gudovich, 1809: Alexander Tormasov, 1811: Filippo Paulucci, 1812: Nikolay Rtishchev.

Fighting with Turkey began in 1807 with the swift seizure of Anapa by Admiral Pustoshkin. Gudovich led his main force toward Akhaltsikhe but lost 900 men while trying to storm Akhalkalaki and withdrew to Georgia. Secondary campaigns against Kars and Poti also failed. The Turks took the offensive, failed three times to take Gyumri and then were completely defeated by Gudovich (Battle of Arpachai). He was congratulated by the Shah, an interesting comment on the relations between the two Muslim empires. Gudovich was replaced by Count Tormasov who arrived about April 1809. In 1810 Poti on the coast was captured. A Turkish invasion was blocked by General Paulucci under the walls Akhalkalaki. In November 1810 a Russian attack on Akhaltsikhe failed due to an outbreak of plague. In 1811 Tormasov was recalled at his own request and replaced by Paulucci in Transcaucasia, Rtishchev taking over the Northern Line. In 1811 more troops were withdrawn to deal with the expected threat of Napoleon. Turks and Persians agreed on a joint attack toward Gyumri. They met at ’Magasberd’ {location?} on 30Aug11. There a Kurd assassinated the Seraskar of Ezerum and this caused the forces to break up. 

Paulucci sent Pyotr Kotlyarevsky against Akhalkalaki. He made a forced march over the snow-covered mountains, avoiding the main roads, attacked at night, and had storming parties on the walls before the Turks knew the Russians were there. By the morning of 10 December he held the fort with a loss of only 30 killed and wounded. For this he was promoted to Major-General at the age of 29. On 21 February 1812 5000 Turks failed to re-take Akhalkalaki. Three days later they were defeated at Parghita {location?}. Paulucci was sent west to command troops against Napoleon, and Rtishchev became commander of forces on both sides of the Caucasus mountains. 

Russia decided to make peace, which was signed by the Treaty of Bucharest (1812).

Aftermath

According to the Treaty, the Ottoman Empire ceded the eastern half of Moldavia to Russia (which renamed the territory as Bessarabia), although it had committed to protecting that region. Russia became a new power in the lower Danube area, and had an economically, diplomatically, and militarily profitable frontier. 

In Transcaucasia, Turkey regained nearly all it had lost in the east: Poti, Anapa and Akhalkalali. Russia retained Sukhum-Kale on the Abkhazian coast. In return, the Sultan accepted the Russian annexation of the Kingdom of Imereti, in 1810.

The treaty was approved by Alexander I of Russia on June 11, some 13 days before Napoleon's invasion of Russia began. The commanders were able to get many of the Russian soldiers in the Balkans back to the western areas before the expected attack of Napoleon.

See also
First Serbian Uprising

Citations

Bibliography

 
 
 
 
 

 
 
 
 
 

Conflicts in 1806
Conflicts in 1807
Conflicts in 1808
Conflicts in 1809
Conflicts in 1810
Conflicts in 1811
Conflicts in 1812
Russo-Turkish wars
Napoleonic Wars
19th century in Armenia
Military history of Georgia (country)
1800s in Romania
1810s in Romania
Ottoman Greece
1800s in the Ottoman Empire
1810s in the Ottoman Empire
19th century in Georgia (country)
1800s in the Russian Empire
1810s in the Russian Empire
1806 in the Russian Empire
1812 in the Russian Empire
1806 in the Ottoman Empire
1812 in the Ottoman Empire